

The Adelaide Australia Temple is the 89th operating temple of the Church of Jesus Christ of Latter-day Saints (LDS Church).

History
Plans to build an LDS Church temple in Adelaide were announced on 17 March 1999. Up until this time, LDS Church members had to travel between fifteen and twenty hours one-way to visit the closest temple in Sydney. Growth in the LDS Church in Australia prompted church leaders to announce new temples across Australia; one in Melbourne, one in Brisbane, one in Perth, and the one in Adelaide.

A groundbreaking ceremony and site dedication were held on 29 May 1999. Vaughn J. Featherstone, a member of the seventy, led the ceremony and gave the site dedication prayer. Despite heavy rains, more than 500 people gathered to witness the groundbreaking and site dedication. Many were involved in the groundbreaking including the Mayor of Adelaide, other government officials, and children.

The temple sits on  a few miles from the centre of the city of Adelaide. The Adelaide Australia Temple was open to the public from 3–10 June 2000.

The temple was dedicated on 15 June 2000 by LDS Church president Gordon B. Hinckley. Hinckley dedicated four different temples in the same trip—the first time this had occurred in church history—with the temple in Adelaide being the third dedicated on the trip. Four dedicatory sessions were held, which allowed for more than 2,500 members to be present at the temple's dedication.

In 2020, like all the church's other temples, the Adelaide Australia Temple was closed in response to the coronavirus pandemic.

See also

 Comparison of temples of The Church of Jesus Christ of Latter-day Saints
 List of temples of The Church of Jesus Christ of Latter-day Saints
 List of temples of The Church of Jesus Christ of Latter-day Saints by geographic region
 Temple architecture (Latter-day Saints)
 The Church of Jesus Christ of Latter-day Saints in Australia

References

Additional reading

External links
Adelaide Australia Temple Official site
Adelaide Australia Temple at ChurchofJesusChristTemples.org

20th-century Latter Day Saint temples
Religious buildings and structures in Adelaide
Temples (LDS Church) completed in 2000
Temples (LDS Church) in Australia
2000 establishments in Australia